The 14th World Scout Jamboree was held July 29 to August 7, 1975, and was hosted by Norway at Lillehammer, on the shore of Lake Mjøsa.

King Olav V and Crown Prince Harald opened "Nordjamb '75", as it became popularly known, in the presence of 17,259 Scouts from 94 countries. Ragnhildur Helgadóttir, the President of the Nordic Council and László Nagy, the Secretary-General of the World Scout Bureau, also spoke at the opening ceremony.

The motto of the jamboree was "Five Fingers, One Hand", an example of international cooperation on the part of the five Nordic countries responsible for its organization. At the opening ceremony, all of the Jamboree participants in the central arena were formed into a giant hand that was photographed from aircraft flying overhead.

This motto stood symbolically for:
 Five fingers separately are small and weak, but together form an efficient and strong unit
 Scouts from all five continents meet at the World Jamboree
 The five Nordic countries jointly host a world event

The British contingent, led by Robert Baden-Powell, 3rd Baron Baden-Powell, included Scouts from Branches in Bermuda, Hong Kong and Rhodesia.

The program of this jamboree included excursions in the mountains by international patrols, activity areas, Nordic trail, choir, visit to Maihaugen cultural museum, and the Jamboree Country Fair. Home hospitality was provided in residences across Scandinavia. The jamboree included in the program several activities involving modern technology, as well as hiking, orienteering and camping.

The two-day hikes were a novel feature for a World Jamboree. The 12,000 Scouts who took part were split into international patrols, which were selected by computer so that the eight members of each patrol came from eight different countries and often lacked a common language. Each patrol was led by an experienced Scout from one of the Scandinavian countries. The resulting 1,500 patrols were sent out to their starting point by bus, 750 on each day. 235 different routes varying from 12 to 25 km were in the surrounding mountains, mostly above the tree line of about 1,000 metres. There were no tents provided for the overnight stop, but each patrol was provided with a large plastic sheet to serve as a bivouac shelter. A safety team consisted of 100 members of the Norwegian Army with a helicopter available.

The jamboree was also visited by Carl XVI Gustav of Sweden and Crown Prince Mohammed VI of Morocco.

A memorable feature of the jamboree was the weather; having been advised to bring clothing for cool and damp conditions, the campers experienced record high temperatures for Norway of up to 36° Celsius.

Campsite
The campground was located on shore of the river Lågen where it enters Lake Mjøsa.

The camp consisted of a central area and ten subcamps:

Activities 
Each Scout had the opportunity to attend at the following activities:
 Physical Activities
 Water Activities
 The North Trail 
 Nature and Conservation
 Handicraft 
 Maihaugen (Visit of the Maihaugen museum in Lillehammer)
 Nordic Culture and Democracy 
 Modern Technology 
 Hike (two-day walk through Nordic area)
On August 2, 1975, the Jamboree County Fair was celebrated. For this event Nord Crowns were issued as Camp currency.

See also
 1994 Winter Olympics
 World Scout Jamboree

References

External links
  on Facebook
 

1975

1975 in Norway
July 1975 events in Europe
August 1975 events in Europe